Westover is an unincorporated community in Baylor County, in the U.S. state of Texas. According to the Handbook of Texas, the community had a population of 18 in 2000.

History
Westover was established when the Gulf, Texas and Western Railroad was built through the area in 1910. J.W. Stevens named the community after his wife's maiden name. A post office was established at Westover in 1910 and remained in operation until 1957. Westover served as a small center for marketing and agriculture. Its population was 90 in 1949, 61 in 1970, 58 in 1990, and 18 in 2000. James H.B. Kyle served as the community's postmaster. Businesses in the community included a bank, barbershops, cotton gins, dry goods stores, churches, and a cemetery. A fire hit the community in 1921 and the railroad was abandoned in 1942, leaving residents to move to Seymour.

Geography

Education
Westover had its own school in 1913 and developed into a school district with as many as 175 students enrolled. The campus had 6 classrooms. The school had a historical marker and headstone to remember it by. Classes were originally held at the local Church of Christ until a school building was built out of frame in 1911. It was then replaced by a building made of bricks, hosted eleven grade levels, and had 7 classrooms, a library, and an auditorium. It had 400 students enrolled in the 1930s, but after people moved on, the school closed in the 1950s. Today, the community is served by the Olney Independent School District.

References

Unincorporated communities in Baylor County, Texas
Unincorporated communities in Texas